Club Deportivo Villegas is a Spanish football team based in Logroño in the autonomous community of La Rioja. Founded in 1974, it plays in Tercera División – Group 16.

Season to season

12 seasons in Tercera División

References

External links
Official Website  
frfutbol.com profile

Football clubs in La Rioja (Spain)
Sport in Logroño
Association football clubs established in 1974
1974 establishments in Spain